Bialosky was a line of teddy bear toys and related children's products popular in the USA during the 1970s and 80s.

The stuffed animals were manufactured by Gund.

In addition to the stuffed animals, Bialosky products included a children's book series.

Partial list of Bialosky titles 
Bialosky and the Big Parade Mystery (1986)

Bialosky's Special Picnic (1985)

My First Cookbook: A Bialosky & Friends Book

Bialosky's Christmas (1984)

Teddy bears